Sarala Kumari Yadav is a Nepalese politician, belonging to the Communist Party of Nepal (Unified Socialist) currently serving as the member of the 1st Federal Parliament of Nepal. In the 2017 Nepalese general election she was elected as a proportional representative from Madheshi category.

References

Nepal MPs 2017–2022
Living people
Communist Party of Nepal (Unified Socialist) politicians
Members of the 1st Nepalese Constituent Assembly
Communist Party of Nepal (Unified Marxist–Leninist) politicians
1965 births